Lightbringer may refer to:

 Lucifer, a Latin name meaning "light-bringer"

Books 
 A series of novels by Brent Weeks
 Lightbringer, a novel in the Empirium trilogy by Claire Legrand
 Dungeon Magic, an arcade game also known as Light Bringer

Characters 
 The Lightbringer, a character in the 2003 novel Chosen of the Gods by Chris Pierson
 Uther the Lightbringer, a character in the 2002 video game Warcraft III: Reign of Chaos

Music 
 "Lightbringer", a song by the band Covenant from the album Modern Ruin
 "Lightbringer", a song by Pentakill

Other uses 
 Lightbringer, the only weapon that can kill Dracula in the 2013 film Dracula: The Dark Prince

See also 
 Light bearer (disambiguation)